Annika Saarnak (from 2014 Annika Aljand, born 19 September 1988) is an Estonian butterfly, freestyle and medley swimmer.

She is 15-time long course and 8-time short course Estonian swimming champion. She has broken 9 Estonian records in swimming.

Personal
She is married to Martti Aljand, they have a daughter.

References

1988 births
Living people
Estonian female backstroke swimmers
Estonian female freestyle swimmers
Estonian female medley swimmers
People from Hiiumaa Parish
21st-century Estonian women